

William Brunsdon Yapp OBE (1909–12 March 1990) was a zoologist and author who worked as a senior lecturer in zoology at the University of Birmingham.

Yapp, the only son of Mr. and Mrs. W. H. Yapp, was born in Bristol where his father had moved to from Hereford so as to provide education to his daughters. After studies at Bristol Grammar School, Yapp went to Downing College, Cambridge where he went by the nickname of Brunny. Graduating in the natural sciences, he went on to teach at Hailebury and then at Manchester before joining Birmingham University. He published several well-known textbooks in zoology and had very strong views on how biology should be taught. He served on the National Parks Commission and attended the first world conference on national parks held in the USA in 1962. He pioneered a bird censusing technique based on walking the perimeter of an area to note the locations of singing birds in his book Birds and Woods (1962). He also served on the committee that helped establish long-distance walking paths in England. After his retirement he served as a scientific expert for Shell chemicals, defending the company, during the 1987-88 trials over dieldrin and its toxicity to wildlife. He supported an informed debate on matters of nuclear energy. In 1957, he gave his address as Stourbridge; and from 1961, he lived at Church End House, Twyning, Tewkesbury.

He was, for a time, Chairman of the research committee of the West Midland Bird Club.

He was appointed an Officer of the Order of the British Empire (OBE) in the 1966 New Year Honours.

Personal life 

Yapp married Bridget Joan Spedding (their engagement was announced in April 1940) she died in Pendyffryn Hall Sanatorium. Penmaenmawr, on 4 September 1945. They had one child, a daughter.

Bibliography

Some preceding editions were also revised by Yapp

Notable papers

References

External links 
 

20th-century British zoologists
1909 births
1990 deaths
Academics of the University of Birmingham
English writers
English zoologists
People from Stourbridge
Officers of the Order of the British Empire